Choibalsan Airport   is a public airport located in Choibalsan, the capital of Dornod Province in Mongolia. A new passenger building was completed in 2001.

Airlines and destinations

See also 
 List of airports in Mongolia

References

External links
  from Civil Aviation Authority of Mongolia
 

Airports in Mongolia
Soviet Air Force bases
Military installations of the Soviet Union in other countries